Hapoel Ironi Petah Tikva is an Israeli women's football club from Petah Tikva competing in the Israeli First League and the Israeli Women's Cup.

History
The club was established in 1998 and competed in the league ever since, usually finishing in mid-table. In the cup, the club had reached the semi-finals 4 times, most recently in 2011.

Current squad

References

External links
 Hapoel Ironi Petah Tikva  Israeli Football Association 

Women's football clubs in Israel
Association football clubs established in 1998